Ti presento un'amica (internationally released as Private Affairs and Quite by Chance) is a 1987 romantic comedy film directed by Francesco Massaro.

At the time of the release, it was referred as a "typical example of average film that in Italy seems to have completely disappeared". The film has a longer version of 180 minutes.

Cast 
Giuliana De Sio: Nagra
Michele Placido: Lionello
Kate Capshaw: Brunetta
David Naughton: Mauro
Luca Barbareschi: Claudio
Carolina Rosi: Marina
Sergio Fantoni	
Lina Polito

References

External links

1987 films
Italian comedy-drama films
English-language Italian films
1987 comedy-drama films
Films directed by Francesco Massaro
Films with screenplays by Suso Cecchi d'Amico
1980s Italian films